The Pakistan Institute of Nuclear Science & Technology (PINSTECH) is a federally funded multiprogram science and technology research institute managed for the Ministry of Energy by the Pakistan Institute of Engineering and Applied Sciences (PIEAS).

Located in Nilore, it maintains a broad portfolio in providing post-graduate and post-doctoral research opportunities in supercomputing, renewable energy, physical sciences, philosophy, materials science, environmental science, and mathematics.

Researchers and scholars are invited from universities throughout Pakistan.

Overview

Research scope

The PINSTECH is regarded as the one of the most advanced and premium research facility in Pakistan. As of 2016, PINSTECH's major research focus is on:

Conducting scientific research and publications in nuclear field at the international level.
Technological development on nuclear sciences for peaceful usage.
Producing radioisotopes and radio pharmaceuticals for catering to the needs of nuclear medical centers, industry and research establishments.
Promoting applications of radiation and isotope technology in various scientific and technological disciplines to support national programs.
Undertaking limited production of sophisticated equipment and special nuclear materials.
Working on important non-nuclear fields which are crucial for the development of science and technology in the country.

The PAEC Chair Dr. I. H. Usmani wanted a premium nuclear facility whose operations are roughly based on the American facilities such as ORNL, ANL, LLNL, and SNL. Many scientists educated at the ORNL and ANL were initially asked to join the PINSTECH. Designed by world-renowned American architect Edward Durell Stone in 1963, the construction was completed in 1965.

About the PINSTECH, Edward Stone once inscribed in these words: "This....has been my greatest work. I am proud that it looks like it belongs in this country.."

The scientific library of the institute consisted of a large section containing loaded historical references and literature on Manhattan Project, brought by Abdus Salam in 1971 prior to start of the Nuclear weapons programme under Zulfikar Ali Bhutto.

History 

The roots of the institution dated back to 1951 when Abdus Salam returned to Pakistan to join University of the Punjab. After facing a fierce opposition from his fellow scientists at the physics department of the University of the Punjab in 1953, Salam soon faced the choice between intellectual death or migration to the stimulating environment of a western institutions from Pakistan. This realization left a deep impression on him and behind his determination to create an institution to which physicists from the developing countries would come as a right to interact with their peers from industrially advanced countries without permanently leaving their own countries. Establishing the world class physics research institute, roughly equivalent to CERN, in Pakistan was a dream of Dr. Abdus Salam who initiated the establishment of PINSTECH.

Together with dr. I. H. Usmani, Salam initiated the deal with the United States to established the P in Nilore and gave its first directorship to nuclear physicist Dr. Rafi Muhammad Chaudhry of the Government College University, Lahore (GCU). For sometime, the PINSTECH became affiliated with the Quaid-i-Azam University in 1967, bearing some special materials testing. Soon, the scientists from Institute of Theoretical Physics at the Quaid-i-Azam University joined the PINSTECH to engage research in physics. After the war with India in 1971, President of Pakistan Zulfikar Ali Bhutto orchestrated to established an efforts towards a nuclear deterrence loosely based on Manhattan Project of the 1940s. Salam took over the operations of PINSTECH institute to oversee the research and development, and its eventual production of the weapons in 1972.

In 1970s, the PINSTECH was an epicenter and a focal point for Pakistani scientists to conduct research in physics where the basic and applied science research in PINSTECH picked up its speed, when Pakistani scientists feared that India was rapidly developing an atomic bomb. The facility continues its expansion in Nilore by the Corps of Engineers.  As Nilore became restricted and secret city, the site was one of the integral site for the nuclear weapons research. In its initial years, the PINSTECH activities were directed towards reprocessing the civilian-grade plutonium to military-grade plutonium. The worked carried out on 20 different laboratories and facilities ran under Munir Ahmad Khan in 1970s. Its first division, the New Labs was dedicated to the production of the weapon grade plutonium of  239Pu. In 1983, Nuclear Physics Division working under Ishfaq Ahmad successfully produced the  239Pu, a weapon grade plutonium. Throughout the formulative year, the scientists and engineers at PINSTECH carried out technologically advanced research at the PINSTECH. On May 30, 1998, the PAEC scientists and engineers had performed the second nuclear test—codename Chagai-II— of a fissionable device, and the device's weapon grade plutonium was produced at the New Labs. The research reactors at the institute were last upgraded by Munir Ahmad Khan — chairman of PAEC at that time — as he led both Electronics Division (ED) and Nuclear Engineering Division (NED) in 1989.

As of today, PINSTECH has been shifted to peacetime research in  medicine, biology, materials and physics. Its Molybdenum-42 facility was used to medical radioisotopes for treating cancer. Scientists from Nuclear Institute for Agriculture and Biology (NIAB) and Nuclear Institute for Food and Agriculture (NIFA) had been using the PINSTECH facilities to conduc advanced research in both medical and food sciences.

Research

PINSTECH is the most advanced facility in the country having state of the art equipment and instruments for doing R & D work; therefore it remain an obvious choice for the students and researchers from all over Pakistan where they could find many important techniques under one roof. Recently the famous concept of centralized analysis facility has been utilized where a researcher can go and work with any piece of nuclear equipment that the researcher has been assigned.  The Central Diagnostic Laboratory (CDL) and Central Analytical Facility (CAF) are the most potent facilities in Pakistan.

PINSTECH promotes applications of radiation and isotope technology in various scientific and technological disciplines to support the nation. It is also working on important non-nuclear fields, which are crucial for the development of science and technology  in the country. In 2020, expansion work was started at PINSTECH to help its "ability to produce isotopes for medical use, especially for preparation of radiopharmaceuticals for cancer patients while also helping the country in its aspirations in other applications of peaceful use of nuclear technology."

Nuclear reactors

PINSTECH has particle accelerators and also operates two small nuclear research reactors, a reprocessing plant and another experimental neutron source based on:
 PARR-I Reactor-Utilize Low-Enriched Uranium (LEU)
 PARR-II Reactor-Utilize High-Enriched Uranium (HEU)
 New Labs-Plutonium reprocessing (PR) facility.
 Charged Particle Accelerator- a nuclear particle accelerator.
 Fast Neutron Generator- An experimental neutron generator.

Research divisions
The PINSTECH four research directorates and each directorate is headed by an appointed Director-Generals. The following PINSTECH Divisions are listed below:

Directorate of Science

Physics Research Division (RPD)

The directorate of science consists of four division, and each divisions are headed by deputy director-generals. In 2004, the PINSTECH administration had brought together all of the groups, and were merged into one single Division, known as Physics Research Division (PRD). Meanwhile, the PINSTECH had also merged Nuclear Physics Division (NPD) and Radiation Physics Division (RPD), Nuclear and Applied Chemistry Divisions as well. The below is the list of research groups working in RPD.

Atomic and Nuclear Radiation Group
Fast Neutron Diffraction Group (FNDG)
Electronic and Magnetic Materials Group (EMMG)
Nuclear Track Studies Group
Nuclear Geology Group
Radiation Damage Group
Mathematical Physics Group (MPG)
Theoretical Physics Group (TPG)
Chemistry Research Division (CRD)

Nuclear Chemistry Division (NCD) - The Nuclear Chemistry Division was founded in 1966 by Dr. Iqbal Hussain Qureshi. As of today, the division is the largest Divisions of the PINSTECH comprising five major groups. Nuclear Chemistry Division has gained experience in the characterization of reactor grade and high purity materials by using advanced analytical techniques and it is dealing with environmental and health related problems.

Applied Chemistry Division
Laser Development Division

Directorate of System and Services
The Directorate of System and Services (DSS, headed by Dr. Matiullah, consists of 5 research divisions that are listed below:

Health Physics Division (HPD) - The Health Physics Division (HPD) was established in 1965 by the small team of health physicists. Founded as a group, it was made a division of PINSTECH in 1966. The division heavily involves its research in medical physics and using nuclear technology in medical and agricultural sciences. 
Nuclear Engineering Division (NED) - The Nuclear Engineering Division (NED, headed by Dr. Masood Iqbal, is one of the most prestigious and well-known Division of Pakistan Institute of Nuclear Science and Technology (PINSTECH). The Division was established in 1965 with the objective to develop technical expertise mainly in the area of Nuclear Reactor Technology. The NED has been used to provide technical assistance and training to the field of reactor technology.
Electronics Maintenance Division (EMD) - The Electronics Division (ED, headed by Mr. Hameed, was formally established in 1967, recognizing its important role in scientific research and development at PINSTECH. The Division has rendered valuable service to the scientific effort by carrying out maintenance of scientific equipment and development of electronic instruments for use in research and development projects. In 1989, the ED was involved in the upgradation program of PARR-I Reactor led by PAEC chairman Munir Ahmad Khan. The ED had supplied and developed electronic material and system for the PARR-I Reactor, and had successfully converted PARR-I to utilize HEU fuel into LEU fuel. An outstanding achievement ED was the design and engineering of nuclear instrumentation of research reactor ( PARR-1) which required a very high degree of sophistication and reliability.

General Services Division (GSD) - The General Services Division (GSD) is responsible for the routine operational research, maintenance repairments of the laboratories, upkeep and development of engineering services such as civil, electrical, mechanical workshops, air conditioning as well as water supply to PINSTECH and annexed labs.

Computer Division (CD) - Computer Division (CD) was established in January 1980 with an aim to provide service and support to the researchers and scientists of PINSTECH in the area of computer hardware and software. Although computer division is still providing computer hardware and software services but it has gradually shifted its activities from being only a service provider division to an important design and development division.

Directorate of Technology
The Directorate of Technology (D-TECH) consists of 3 divisions that are  Materials Division (MD), Isotope Application Division (IAD), and the Isotope Production Division (IPD).This is currently overseen by Dr. Gulzar Hussain Zahid, Chief Engineer.

Materials Division (MD) - Materials Division (MD) was established in 1973, with aim of to provide technical assistance to other PAEC's projects on development, production and characterization of materials.
Isotope Application Division (IAD) - The Isotope Application Division (IAD) was established in PINSTECH by Dr. Naeem Ahmad Khan in early 1971. Having known as the problem solver in the institute, the IAD is responsible for solving the problems in Isotope Hydrolog, Environmental Pollution, Non-Destructive Testing, Industrial Applications, Life Sciences, and Isotope Geology.  IAD also extends expert services to solve relevant problems faced by the industrial sector and different organizations.
Isotope Production Division (IPD) - The Isotope Production Division (IPD) It contains Molly Group, Generator Production group, Kit production Group. IPD also involves in modification of exiting isotope production facility.

Directorate of Coordination
The Directorate of Coordination, headed by Engr. Iqbal Hussain Khan, is an administrative directorate which consists of 3 administrative divisions. The Scientific Information Division (SID), Human Resource Development (HRD), and Management Information System (MIS), are included in this division.
Scientific Information Division (SID) - The Scientific Information Division (SID, headed by Dr. Ishtiaq Hussain Bokhari, was established in PINSTECH in 1966. It was upgraded into a full-fledged division in 1984. SID is the central source of scientific and technical information not only for Pakistan Atomic Energy Commission but also for other scientific organizations and universities in the country and is responsible for the efficient acquisition, storage, retrieval and dissemination of Scientific  and Technical information in support of the PAEC program.

User facilities 

Analytical Laboratories
Charged Particle Accelerator
Computer Oriented Services
Corrosion Testing
Environmental Studies  Building
Health Physics, Radiation Safety & Radioactive Waste Management
Irradiation Laboratories
Lasers  Laboratory and Testing Facility
Materials Development & Characterization
Nuclear Geological Services
Processing of Polymers
Production of Radioisotopes & Radio-pharmaceuticals
Radiation & Radioisotope Applications
Repair & Maintenance of Electronic Equipment
Scientific & Industrial Instruments
Scientific Glass Blowing
Scientific Information
Technical Services & Collaboration
Vacuum Technology Laboratory
Vibration Analysis

Director Generals (DGs) of PINSTECH

Notes

References

Nuclear technology in Pakistan
Nuclear research institutes
Particle physics facilities
International research institutes
Research institutes in Pakistan
Pakistan federal departments and agencies
Constituent institutions of Pakistan Atomic Energy Commission
Edward Durell Stone buildings
Laboratories in Pakistan
Mathematical institutes
Chemical research institutes
Pakistan Institute of Engineering and Applied Sciences
Biological research institutes
Supercomputer sites
1965 establishments in Pakistan
Abdus Salam
Theoretical physics institutes